Adrar (in Tifinagh script "ⴰⴷⵔⴰⵔ"), a Berber word meaning "mountain", is the name of several areas in Northwest Africa:

Algeria
 Adrar, Algeria, a town in Algeria
 Adrar Province, an administrative division of Algeria
 Adrar District, a district of Adrar Province, Algeria
 Adrar Afao, the highest peak in the Tassili n'Ajjer range in SE Algeria
 Adrar n Jerjer, a mountain range of the Tell Atlas

Mauritania
 Adrar Plateau, a natural and historical region of the Sahara in Mauritania
 Adrar Region, an administrative division of Mauritania

Mali
 Adrar des Ifoghas, a massif in the Kidal Region of Mali